Dactylonotus is a genus of flies in the family Dolichopodidae. Six of the species in the genus are found in southern Africa, though one species, Dactylonotus formosus, is found in New Zealand.

Species 
 Dactylonotus formosus (Parent, 1933)
 Dactylonotus frater Parent, 1939
 Dactylonotus grandicornis Parent, 1934
 Dactylonotus nigricorpus Grichanov, 2016
 Dactylonotus rudebecki Vanschuytbroeck, 1960
 Dactylonotus tsitsikamma Grichanov, 2016
 Dactylonotus univittatus (Loew, 1858)

Dactylonotus meuffelsi Grichanov, 1998 is a synonym of D. rudebecki Vanschuytbroeck, 1960.

References 

Diaphorinae
Dolichopodidae genera
Diptera of Africa
Diptera of New Zealand
Taxa named by Octave Parent